Melanella cylindrica is a species of sea snail, a marine gastropod mollusk in the family Eulimidae. The species is one of a number within the genus Melanella.

References

 Thiele J. (1925). Gastropoden der Deutschen Tiefsee-Expedition. II Teil. Wissenschaftliche Ergebnisse der Deutschen Tiefsee-Expedition auf dem Dampfer "Valdivia" 1898-1899. 17(2): 35-382, pls 13-46 [reprints paginated 1–348, pls 1–34].
page(s): 143, pl. 24 [12] fig. 15, 15a

External links
 Barnard, K. H. (1963). Contributions to the knowledge of South African marine Mollusca. Part III. Gastropoda: Prosobranchiata: Taenioglossa. i>Annals of the South African Museum 47(1): 1-199

cylindrica
Gastropods described in 1925